Madison Danielle Davenport (born November 22, 1996) is an American actress and singer, best known for her role as Kate Fuller in From Dusk till Dawn: The Series. She also appeared in Kit Kittredge: An American Girl as Kit's best friend Ruthie Smithens.

Career
She started her career in 2005 when she had a small role in Conversations with Other Women. Soon after she appeared in the television series Numb3rs, Close to Home, CSI: NY, Shameless, and Hot Properties.

In 2006, Davenport voiced the porcupine Quillo in Over the Hedge. She also had a guest starring role in Bones as Megan, a little girl who helps Temperance Brennan and Seeley Booth.

Davenport appeared in Legion of Super Heroes and While the Children Sleep in 2007. In 2008, Davenport was seen in ER and also had a voice over appearance in Special Agent Oso as Stacey & Fiona. She also had many film credits in 2008 including Humboldt County, Kit Kittredge: An American Girl, The Attic Door and Christmas Is Here Again.

In 2010, Davenport starred in the Lifetime television film Amish Grace, as Mary Beth Graber, a little girl who dies in a school shooting. She also played Destiny in Jack and the Beanstalk, and had a leading role in the television film Dad's Home as Lindsay Westman.

In 2011, Davenport had a guest appearance in CSI: Crime Scene Investigation as father-murderer Camryn Pose, and began a recurring role in the U.S. television series Shameless. She played the supporting role of Hannah in the 2012 film The Possession.

Davenport played Na'el, a potential romantic partner of Ham (Logan Lerman), in the biblical epic film Noah, alongside Russell Crowe, Anthony Hopkins, Jennifer Connelly, and Emma Watson. The 2014 film was directed by Darren Aronofsky.

In June 2022, Davenport came out as bisexual on her Instagram account.

Filmography

Film

Television

Video games

Music

References

External links
 
 

1996 births
21st-century American actresses
Actresses from San Antonio
American child actresses
American child singers
American film actresses
American television actresses
American voice actresses
Living people
Singers from Texas
Bisexual actresses
Musicians from San Antonio
21st-century American singers
LGBT people from Texas
21st-century American women singers
American bisexual actors